West Hull A.R.L.F.C. is an amateur rugby league football club from Kingston upon Hull, currently playing in the National Conference League Premier Division. The team plays their home matches at West Hull Community Park and their strip colours are green and gold.

History
The club was formed in 1961 as Birds Eye A.R.L.F.C., named after the local factory where most of the players came from. Following the formation of the British Amateur Rugby League Association in 1971, the club was renamed to West Hull A.R.L.F.C.

In the 1973–74 season, the club won the inaugural BARLA Yorkshire Cup competition, defeating Illingworth in the final. In 1976–77, under the name Cawoods, they won the BARLA National Cup for the first time with a 10–3 win against National Dock Labour Board (now known as Hull Dockers). The following season, they became the first amateur team since 1909 to defeat a professional side when they won 9–8 against Halifax in the first round of the Players No. 6 Trophy.

In 1986, the club was one of ten founder members of the BARLA National Amateur League (now known as the National Conference League). The club won the National League championship for the first time in the 1988–89 season.

In 1996, West Hull reached the fifth round of the Challenge Cup, becoming the first amateur club to defeat professional opposition twice in the same year. The team won 35–20 in the third round tie against Highfield, followed by a 10–6 win in the next round against York in blizzard conditions at The Boulevard. The club went on to dominate the game at amateur level over the next few years, winning five National Conference League championships between 1997 and 2002.

In 2005, the club was relegated from the NCL Premier Division, but returned to the top flight a year later after finishing the 2005–06 season as champions of Division One.

Honours
 National Conference League Premier Division
 Winners (9): 1988–89, 1996–97, 1998–99, 1999–2000, 2000–01, 2001–02, 2013, 2014, 2020
 National Conference League Division One
 Winners (2): 1991–92, 2005–06
 BARLA National Cup
 Winners (3): 1976–77, 1994–95, 2001–02
 BARLA Yorkshire Cup
 Winners (5): 1973–74, 1981–82, 1984–85, 1987–88, 1988–89

References

External links
 West Hull ARLFC on NCL website

 

Sport in Kingston upon Hull
BARLA teams
Rugby league teams in the East Riding of Yorkshire
Rugby clubs established in 1961
1961 establishments in England
English rugby league teams